Jamie Vincent Junior Reckord (born 9 March 1992) is an English footballer who plays as a full back for Yeovil Town. He started his career at Wolverhampton Wanderers and during his time there had spells on loan with Northampton Town, Scunthorpe United, Coventry City, Plymouth Argyle and Swindon Town.

Career

Wolverhampton Wanderers
Reckord joined Wolverhampton Wanderers academy in December 2001 before being given a scholarship. Then in 2010, Reckord signed his first professional contract at the club.

In May 2011, Reckord signed a 12-month contract extension, keeping him at the club until 2012. He made his Wolves debut in a League Cup match on 23 August 2011, in a 4–0 win over his former loan club, Northampton. This was to be his only appearance for the club until another League Cup tie two years later on 6 August 2013, in a 1–0 loss against Morecambe.

After an impressive loan spell at Scunthorpe United, Reckord had his contract with Wolves extended for another 12 months in May 2011. At the end of the 2013–14 season, it was announced that his contract with Wolves would not be extended.

Loan spells
In March 2011, Reckord gained his first senior football experience when he moved on loan for the rest of the season to League Two side Northampton Town, where he made his professional debut a day before his 19th birthday in a 2–1 defeat at Chesterfield. Reckford went on to make eleven appearances for Northampton Town.

On 30 January 2012, Reckord joined League One side Scunthorpe United on a month's loan, later extended for a further month. Reckford made his Scunthorpe United debut on 14 February 2012, in a 1–0 win over Rochdale. His four appearances at Scunthorpe led to the club extending the move until 31 March 2012. Then on 5 April 2012, the loan was extended until the end of the season. The next day, Reckord then provided an assist for Jon Parkin, in a 1–0 win over Exeter City. Reckord went on to make seventeen appearances for the club before a shoulder injury kept him out for the rest of the season.

Reckord went out on loan again in September 2012, when he joined League One side Coventry City on an agreed 93-day emergency loan. He made his Coventry City debut the next day, coming on as a substitute for Billy Daniels in the 64th minutes, in a 2–1 loss against Carlisle United. However, after nine appearances for Coventry, he was ultimately recalled early by his parent club after failing to get regular playing time.

In September 2013, Reckord was loaned to League Two side Plymouth Argyle for three months, during which he made 16 appearances before returning to his parent club.

On 25 January 2014, Reckord again moved on loan, this time to League One Swindon Town in a three-month deal. He made his debut the same day, coming on as a substitute for Jay McEveley after he was injured, in a 3–1 loss against Shrewsbury Town. Reckord made only three appearances for the Robins during this loan, as his first team opportunities soon became limited before returning to Wolves.

Ross County
On 16 October 2014, Reckord signed for Scottish Premiership side Ross County. On 8 November 2014, he made his Ross County debut, in a 3–0 win over Kilmarnock. Reckord provided two assists in two separate matches against Dundee United and Motherwell.

After making an impression in the left-back position, Reckord signed an 18-month contract with the club. He then scored his first goal, in a 1–0 win over Dundee on 28 February 2015.

On 14 April 2016, Reckord was released by Scottish Premiership side Ross County.

Oldham Athletic
On 11 July 2016, Reckord signed a one-year deal with League One side Oldham Athletic. He was released at the end of the season and joined Solihull Moors on a short-term deal in December 2017.

Wrexham
On 14 August 2020, Reckord signed for National League club Wrexham on a one-year deal.

Boreham Wood
On 21 January 2022, Reckord moved to fellow National League club Boreham Wood on an eighteen-month contract following the mutual termination of his Wrexham contract.

Yeovil Town
On 1 July 2022, Reckord signed for fellow National League club Yeovil Town on a one-year deal with an option of an additional year.

International career
During his development, Reckord represented England both at England U16 and England U17 level.

Career statistics

References

External links

1992 births
Living people
Footballers from Wolverhampton
English footballers
Association football fullbacks
Wolverhampton Wanderers F.C. players
Northampton Town F.C. players
Scunthorpe United F.C. players
Coventry City F.C. players
Plymouth Argyle F.C. players
Swindon Town F.C. players
Ross County F.C. players
Oldham Athletic A.F.C. players
Solihull Moors F.C. players
Wrexham A.F.C. players
Boreham Wood F.C. players
Yeovil Town F.C. players
English Football League players
Scottish Professional Football League players
National League (English football) players